Ján Podhradský (31 August 1917 – 15 December 1998) is a former Slovak footballer who played in Yugoslavia and Slovakia.

Club career 
He was born during World War I in the town of Kisač, on the outskirts of Novi Sad, at the time still part of the Austro-Hungarian Empire but after the war became part of Serbia and subsequently Yugoslavia. He started playing in a local club named SŠK Bački Petrovac which was a club gathering the local Slovakian community. It was while playing there that he got spotted by one of the major regional clubs, FK Vojvodina, which brought him to their ranks in 1935. His technical abilities were highlighted by the local press, and soon he became the target of BSK Belgrade, the Serbian club which was dominating the Yugoslav championship in the 1930s. One year after joining Vojvodina, Podhradský was again on the move, this time to the capital Belgrade. He became the regular left midfielder of BSK during the three seasons he played with BSK. He made 28 appearances scoring 16 goals in the two editions of the Yugoslav championship he played with BSK, the last one crowned with the national trophy.

In 1939 BSK was bringing numerous new players, and Podhradský left and joined SK Štefanik, a club from Stara Pazova, where he played until 1941 when Second World War started in Yugoslavia with the Axis invasion of the country. That is when Podhradský leaves Yugoslavia and moves to the country his parents came from Slovakia, which was now Nazi-German supported independent state after the dismemberment of Czechoslovakia. Podhradský settles in the capital Bratislava and is immediately incorporated into the Slovak most dominant club, ŠK Bratislava.  Since his arrival in 1941 till his retirement in 1947 Podhradský made 124 goals in 153 official matches for ŠK Bratislava, and has won two national titles, in 1942 and 1944. He then retired and lived in Bratislava until his death in 1998.

His name in Slovakian is Ján Podhradský, although during the period he played in Yugoslavia his name was often spelled in a simplified version as Jan Podhradski (Cyrillic: Јан Подхрадски).

International career 
Podhradský is among the players that played for two different national teams. He represented Yugoslavia in a friendly match against Romania in 1938, and, after moving to Slovakia, he played four times for Slovakia in friendlies, in the period Slovak national team was active during the war.

Honours

 BSK Belgrade
Yugoslav First League: 1938-39

 ŠK Slovan Bratislava
Slovak League: 1942, 1944

References

External links 
 

1917 births
1998 deaths
Footballers from Novi Sad
Slovak footballers
Serbian footballers
Yugoslav footballers
Yugoslavia international footballers
Slovakia international footballers
Dual internationalists (football)
Association football midfielders
FK Vojvodina players
OFK Beograd players
Slovak people of Serbian descent
Yugoslav First League players
ŠK Slovan Bratislava players